The Cuban pine forests are a tropical coniferous forest ecoregion on the Caribbean islands of Cuba and Isla de la Juventud.

Description
Pine forests are found primarily in well-drained, nutrient-poor, acidic soils such as quartziferous sands, pseudo-spodosols in the west, and lateritic soils. Pine trees and encino (Quercus sagrana) obtain nutrients through an ectomycorrhizal symbiosis with fungi, allowing them to attain tree size. The forests feature a dense xerophytic brushy story of mainly Rubiaceae, Euphorbiaceae, Myrtaceae, and Melastomataceae along with a herbaceous story of a few epiphytes, primarily from the genus Tillandsia, and lianas. Secondary forests formed by deforestation have a more open canopy with an understory dominated by Comocladia dentata; grasses, lianas and epiphytes are poorly represented.

Western pine forests
Western pine forests are found in the northern and southern plains surrounding the Sierra de los Órganos in Pinar del Río Province and on the northern half of Isla de la Juventud. Other species such include peralejo (Byrsonima crassifolia), palma barrigona (Colpothrinax wrightii), icaco (Chrysobalanus icaco var. hellocarpus), encino (Quercus sagrana), Calophyllum pinetorum, Erythroxylum minutifolium, Phania cajalbanica, Vaccinium cubense, Hyperbaena columbica, Clusia rosea, Copernicia species, yuraguano (Coccothrinax yuraguana), Aristida species and Andropogon species. Ferritic soils in Pinar del Río, such as in the Cajálbana plateau, are home to Pinus caribaea var. caribaea and an understory rich in endemic species. Mixed pine forests develop over oligotrophic quartzitic yellow soils in northern Pinar del Río province and Isla de la Juventud. They feature Pinus caribaea var. caribaea, P. tropicalis, and, possibly, Quercus sagrana. Dry, rocky pine forests found on the southern side of the Cajálbana plateau include pines, thorny scrublands, and Agave cajalbanensis, an endemic succulent.

Eastern pine forests
Small patches of pine forest occur around the Sierra Cristal, Nipe-Sagua-Baracoa Mountains, and Sierra Maestra. Consequently, some of the vegetation resembles that of the rainforests, with an abundance of ferns. Pino de la Maestra (Pinus maestrensis) predominates in the Sierra Maestra, developing on landslide areas over granitic rock, while the Pino de Mayarí (Pinus cubensis) predominates in the Nipe-Sagua-Baracoa. Some accompanying species in these forests are the griñapo (Dracaena cubensis), Eupatorium spp., Myrtus spp., Baccharis spp., Jacaranda arborea and Eugenia pinetorum.

Fauna
Endemic birds include the olive-capped warbler (Dendroica pityophila), Cuban kite (Chondrohierax wilsonii), Cuban trogon (Priotelus temnurus), Cuban amazon, (Amazona leucocephala) and Cuban tody (Todus multicolor). The Cuban ivory-billed woodpecker (Campephilus principalis bairdii) may remain in eastern pine forests, but is probably extinct.

References

Tropical and subtropical coniferous forests
Ecoregions of the Caribbean
Ecoregions of Cuba

Natural history of Cuba
Neotropical ecoregions